Kommuna is a rural locality (a selo) in Chokhsky Selsoviet, Gunibsky District, Republic of Dagestan, Russia. The population was 734 as of 2010.

Nationalities 
Avars live there.

Geography
Kommuna is located 7 km south of Gunib (the district's administrative centre) by road. Gunib and Khutni are the nearest rural localities.

References 

Rural localities in Gunibsky District